Columbus Lake is a lake in northeast Mississippi on the Tennessee-Tombigbee Waterway. Close to Columbus, it is impounded by the John C. Stennis Lock and Dam.

References 

Landforms of Clay County, Mississippi
Tennessee–Tombigbee Waterway
Reservoirs in Mississippi
Landforms of Lowndes County, Mississippi